The decade of the 2000s in film involved many significant developments in the film industries around the world, especially in the technology used. Building on developments in the 1990s, computers were used to create effects that would have previously been more expensive, from the subtle erasing of surrounding islands in Cast Away (leaving Tom Hanks' character stranded with no other land in sight) to the vast battle scenes such as those in The Matrix sequels and 300.

The 2000s saw the resurgence of several genres. Fantasy film franchises dominated the box office with The Lord of the Rings, Harry Potter, Pirates of the Caribbean, the Star Wars prequel trilogy (beginning in 1999), The Chronicles of Narnia, etc. Comic book superhero films became a mainstream blockbuster genre following the releases of X-Men, Unbreakable, and Spider-Man. Gladiator similarly sparked the revival of historical epic films, while the Bollywood-inspired Moulin Rouge! did the same for live action musical films in the Western world, where Indian musicals such as Lagaan and Devdas also began gaining mainstream exposure. Hong Kong fight choreographers like Yuen Woo-ping continued their influence in Hollywood with such martial arts films as Kill Bill: Volume 1 and Kill Bill: Volume 2, even leading to the spread of wire fu techniques into other subgenres, alongside filmmaker John Woo's gun fu from the likes of Mission: Impossible 2. The battle royale genre also began with the release of the Japanese film Battle Royale.

In addition, film categories not known for their popular appeal in North America became increasingly attractive to moviegoers. Non-English language films such as Crouching Tiger, Hidden Dragon, Hero (2002), The Passion of the Christ, and Pan's Labyrinth; as well as documentary films like An Inconvenient Truth, March of the Penguins, Super Size Me, and Fahrenheit 9/11; became very successful.

Computer animation replaced traditional animation as the dominant medium for animated feature films in American cinema (especially after the release of Shrek): DreamWorks Animation was the top animation studio in that decade, with Pixar and 20th Century Fox Animation following close behind (the latter after Fox Animation Studios was closed down on October 31, 2000). Further extending to the exploration of motion capture technology in such films as Sinbad: Beyond the Veil of Mists, Final Fantasy: The Spirits Within and The Polar Express. However, hand-drawn anime films also gained more exposure outside of Japan with the releases of Hayao Miyazaki's Spirited Away, Howl's Moving Castle and Ponyo; while stop-motion films regained popularity thanks to Chicken Run, Wallace & Gromit: The Curse of the Were-Rabbit and Coraline.

Highest-grossing films 

The list has more 2008 and 2007 films in the top 50 than any other year, each with eight. They are followed by 2009, 2005 and 2004, each with six. Figures are given in United States dollars (USD).

Highest-grossing film per year

Most acclaimed films of the decade 

According to They Shoot Pictures, Don't They?, a site which numerically calculates reception among critics, the most acclaimed films of the 2000s are:
 In the Mood for Love
 Mulholland Drive
 Yi Yi
 There Will Be Blood
 Spirited Away
 Eternal Sunshine of the Spotless Mind
 Caché/Hidden
 Tropical Malady
 Lost in Translation
 City of God
 Brokeback Mountain
 Crouching Tiger, Hidden Dragon
 WALL-E
 Talk to Her
 Dogville
 Tie Xi Qu: West of the Tracks
 Russian Ark
 The White Ribbon
 The Death of Mr. Lazarescu
 No Country for Old Men

According to Metacritic, which analysed many of the notable 'best films of the decade' lists to compile the results, the top twenty films most often and most notably included in these lists are:
 There Will Be Blood
 Eternal Sunshine of the Spotless Mind
 Mulholland Drive
 No Country for Old Men
 The Lord of the Rings: The Return of the King
 The Lord of the Rings: The Two Towers
 Spirited Away
 4 Months, 3 Weeks and 2 Days
 The Lord of the Rings: The Fellowship of the Ring
 The Dark Knight
 Amélie
 Children of Men
 Memento
 Pan's Labyrinth
 United 93
 Wall-E
 Almost Famous
 Brokeback Mountain
 Far from Heaven
 Lost in Translation

As well as this, the ten films released in the 2000s which got the highest average critic scores according to Metacritic are:

 Pan's Labyrinth
 4 Months, 3 Weeks and 2 Days
 Ratatouille
 Spirited Away
 The Hurt Locker
 The Lord of the Rings: The Return of the King
 Sideways
 Wall-E
 Crouching Tiger, Hidden Dragon
 35 Shots of Rum

BBC's 100 Greatest Films of the 21st Century poll of film critics listed the following as the top ten best films of the 2000s:

 Mulholland Drive
 In the Mood for Love
 There Will Be Blood
 Spirited Away
 Eternal Sunshine of the Spotless Mind
 Yi Yi
 No Country for Old Men
 Zodiac
 Children of Men
 4 Months, 3 Weeks and 2 Days
The New York Times list of "The 25 Best Films of the 21st Century So Far" selected the following as the top five best films of the 2000s:
 There Will Be Blood
 Spirited Away
 Million Dollar Baby
 The Death of Mr. Lazarescu
 Yi Yi

Moviefone's list of "50 Best Movies of the Decade" included the following films in the top five:

 Kill Bill
 City of God
 Battle Royale
 No Country for Old Men
 The Dark Knight
Filmmaker Quentin Tarantino selected the following as the best and most influential films of the decade:

 Battle Royale
 Anything Else
 Dogville
 The Host
 Joint Security Area
 Lost in Translation
 Memories of Murder
 Shaun of the Dead
 Team America: World Police
 Unbreakable

List of films 

 2000 in film
 2001 in film
 2002 in film
 2003 in film
 2004 in film
 2005 in film
 2006 in film
 2007 in film
 2008 in film
 2009 in film

See also 

 Film
 History of film
 Lists of films
 Popular culture: 2000s in music, 2000s in sports, 2000s in television

References 
Highest-grossing films

 
Films by decade
Film by decade